Serghei Lașcencov (born 24 March 1980 in Zdolbuniv, Ukrainian SSR) is a retired Moldovan footballer and the former captain of the Moldovan national team. In 2010, he was disqualified for five years for match-fixing.

Career
In the summer of 2008 Lașcencov moved to Azerbaijan Premier League side Olimpik Baku on an initial one-year contract. For the 2009–10 season he was made captain of the team.

In August 2010, Lașcencov was given a lifetime ban from football for his involvement in the match-fixing surrounding Metalist Kharkiv and Karpaty Lviv's game on 19 April 2008 during the 2007–08 season. On 17 October 2010, his ban was reduced to five years, a decision that was upheld by CAS in August 2013.

Career statistics

International career
Lașcencov made his debut for Moldova in 2004, going on to make 36 appearances and captain the team before his ban.

References

External links
 
 
 

1980 births
Living people
People from Zdolbuniv
Moldovan footballers
Moldova international footballers
Moldovan expatriate footballers
Expatriate footballers in Ukraine
Expatriate footballers in Azerbaijan
Association football defenders
FC Metalist Kharkiv players
FC Mariupol players
FC Karpaty Lviv players
AZAL PFK players
Ukrainian Premier League players
Ukrainian Amateur Football Championship players
Moldovan people of Ukrainian descent
Moldovan expatriate sportspeople in Ukraine
Moldovan expatriate sportspeople in Azerbaijan
Match fixers